Paul Edward Nolen (September 3, 1929 – May 7, 2009) was an American basketball player. A 6'10" center, Nolen attended Texas Technological College (now Texas Tech University), where he was a three-time all-conference selection in the Border Conference, including first-team honors as a sophomore and senior. In 1951, he won the Border Conference scoring crown after averaging 19.9 points per game. Over his career with the Raiders, he scored 1,306 points.

Drafted by the Baltimore Bullets with the 35th pick in the 1953 NBA draft, he signed with the team during the summer, and appeared in one NBA game for the team on November 7, 1953. Following hs NBA stint, he played for the Washington Generals, the exhibition team that always plays the Harlem Globetrotters. On December 6, 1953, he scored 6 points in the Generals 49–48 win against the Philadelphia Warriors.

References

External links
 Paul Nolen @ basketball-reference.com
 Texas Tech history and traditions: Players

1929 births
2009 deaths
American men's basketball players
Baltimore Bullets (1944–1954) draft picks
Baltimore Bullets (1944–1954) players
Basketball players from Texas
Centers (basketball)
People from Johnson County, Texas
Texas Tech Red Raiders basketball players
Washington Generals players